Windpassing may refer to several locations:

Windpassing (Büchlberg) , Büchlberg municipality, Passau district, Bavaria, Germany
Windpassing (Hauzenberg), Hauzenberg municipality, Passau district, Bavaria, Germany
Windpassing (Ennsdorf), Ennsdorf municipality, Amstetten district, Lower Austria
Windpassing (Grabern), Grabern municipality, Hollabrunn district, Lower Austria
Windpassing (Neustadtl), Neustadtl an der Donau municipality, Amstetten district, Lower Austria
Windpassing (St. Pölten), Harland subdistrict, St. Pölten district, Lower Austria
Windpassing (Steinakirchen), Steinakirchen am Forst municipality, Scheibbs district, Lower Austria
Windpassing (Altenberg), Altenberg bei Linz municipality, Urfahr-Umgebung district, Upper Austria